KC is a pop rock album by Filipina singer-songwriter KC Concepcion and is her second studio album. "Tayo Na", "Takipsilim" and "Worth the Wait" are all original compositions by KC Concepcion.

The album was certified 2× Platinum in the Philippines. The album has twelve tracks, three of which, "Not Like the Movies", "Takipsilim" and "After the End" were released as singles. "Not Like the Movies" and "After the End" were written by Jaye Muller and Ben Patton, "Breathe You" was composed by Jude Gitamondoc, while "Takipsilim", "Worth the Wait", "Magandang Umaga" were written by Concepcion.

Singles and certification
The music video for "Not Like the Movies" was released on July 2, 2010.

The video for "Takipsilim" was released on August 31, 2010.

Track listing

2010 albums
KC Concepcion albums